Ismail Sabri Yaakob, the 9th prime minister of Malaysia, made 11 international trips to 12 nations during his premiership, which began on 21 August 2021 and ended on 24 November 2022.

Summary 
The number of visits per country where Prime Minister Ismail Sabri travelled are:
 One: Singapore, Brunei, Cambodia, Thailand, Vietnam, Qatar, United Kingdom, Japan and Turkey
 Two: Indonesia, United States and United Arab Emirates

2021

2022

Multilateral meetings

See also 
 Foreign relations of Malaysia
 List of international prime ministerial trips made by Anwar Ibrahim
 List of international prime ministerial trips made by Muhyiddin Yassin
 List of international prime ministerial trips made by Mahathir Mohamad
 List of international prime ministerial trips made by Najib Razak

References 

2021 in international relations
2022 in international relations
Foreign relations of Malaysia
Ismail Sabri Yaakob
Lists of diplomatic trips
Diplomatic visits by heads of government
21st century in international relations
Malaysian prime ministerial visits